The South Carolina Department of Agriculture is a state government agency that oversees and promotes agriculture in the state of South Carolina. It is led by a commissioner of agriculture, a position currently held by Republican Hugh Weathers.

Responsibilities

According to South Carolina law, "The Department of Agriculture shall execute the laws of this State pertaining to agriculture." The SCDA is also responsible for leading safety inspections of farms across South Carolina. In order for any business to sell, manufacture, or pack and food in South Carolina, it must receive a manufacturers, processors and packers permit after inspection from the SCDA. 

In 2006, the department enacted the phrase "Certified SC Grown," a label which can only be attached to produce grown in South Carolina. The goal is to encourage more consumers to purchase products produced in South Carolina to support local farmers. According to the department's leader, the SCDA is responsible for $50 billion in economic impact. The SCDA also establishes lotteries from grants and loans for low-income farmers.

The SCDA is also responsible for regulating the sale of gasoline in South Carolina. The department is tasked with ensuring that the state's 64,000+ fuel pumps for motor vehicles in addition to airline fuel pumps are functioning correctly, are dispensing safe and balanced gasoline, and do not contain fraud measures, such as credit card skimmers.

History 

The Department of Agriculture was founded in 1879 and launched in 1880 to oversee and promote agriculture in South Carolina. After the era of slavery in South Carolina, much of the soil had been depleted by the overproduction of cotton. Because the state lacked statistical data on how to make executive decisions regarding agriculture, the General Assembly created the department of agriculture. The department was established with a broad array of responsibilities: fertilizer regulation, soil improvement and analysis, distribution of seeds, sheep husbandry, immigration, geology, labor, and forestry.

Commissioners
There have been 12 commissioners of agriculture since 1880.

References

State departments of agriculture of the United States
Agriculture
Government agencies established in 1879
1879 establishments in the United States
Agriculture in South Carolina